Gladwyn Klosking Bush  (14 March 1914 – 24 November 2003), also known as Miss Lassie, was a Caymanian folk painter.

Life and career 
Gladwyn was born in South Church Street, George Town, Cayman Islands in March 1914 to Richard and Margaret Bush and was one of ten children. Many Caymanians who grew up with her described Gladwyn in her childhood as being a "wild child". Friends recalled her chasing them and her brothers down the beach with a machete. Others remember her having broken glass bottles lining her fence due to a belief it would protect her household from spirits.

During her life, she was not oblivious to those who declared her a madwoman, but instead took some pride in the matter. Henry Mutoo, one of her biggest supporters even stated “reputation that she had was like a lot of older people – if you get on her wrong side she would curse you. So this is why perhaps she had this reputation of being a madwoman.”

Paintings
Bush began painting aged 62 after an experience she described as "visionary". She was inspired to produce artwork after having multiple visions in her sleep of Jesus visiting her and the island. Her work is a mixture of religious themes and documentation of events that had happened on island. For example, one of her works records a large tidal wave which had struck the island in 1932. She painted mainly in oil on canvas. She also decorated the walls and furnishings of her home with her work.

Her "visionary" art style also served as inspiration for other artists who have also experienced similar visions.

Awards
In 1997, Bush was appointed to the Order of the British Empire (MBE) in the Queen's Birthday Honours List "for services to art in the Cayman Islands". She was also awarded the Heritage Award of the Cayman National Cultural Foundation. The foundation also published a book of her paintings, My Markings...the Art of Gladwyn K. Bush, and she has been profiled in numerous books of outsider art.  Her paintings are in private collections worldwide, and may also be seen at the American Visionary Art Museum in Baltimore, Maryland.

House 
Following her death in 2003, possession of Gladwyn's home was given to her son Richard. He died shortly after and the interior was destroyed by Hurricane Ivan in 2004. The land was then purchased in 2008 by and preserved by the Cayman National Cultural Foundation. Since April 2011, it has been open as a museum, providing bimonthly tours every second and fourth Saturday. It is also available for school-led tours by appointment.

References

1914 births
2003 deaths
Caymanian painters
Outsider artists
British women painters
20th-century British painters
20th-century British women artists
Women outsider artists
Members of the Order of the British Empire